Izbica Kujawska  is a town in central Poland with 2,808 inhabitants (2004). It is situated in the Kuyavian-Pomeranian Voivodeship (since 1999), having previously been in Włocławek Voivodeship (1975-1998).

Archaeology
In the Izbica forest on the way to village Wietrzychowice there's a group of megalithic tombs called Polish Pyramids. They are elongated mounds up to 120 meters in length and a height of 2–3 meters with originally built entrance on one side and more than one grave inside. Built probably around 4000 BC.

Notable People
 Yisroel Moshe Olewski

References

External links

Izbica Kujawska official website
 

Cities and towns in Kuyavian-Pomeranian Voivodeship
Włocławek County
Kalisz Governorate
Poznań Voivodeship (1921–1939)